Michael Weeder  is the current Dean of St. George's Cathedral, Cape Town.

Notes

External links 
 Michael Weeder's testimony to the Truth and Reconciliation Commission
 St. George's Cathedral

Living people
20th-century South African Anglican priests
21st-century South African Anglican priests
Deans of Cape Town
Year of birth missing (living people)